Ann Reinking (November 10, 1949December 12, 2020) was an American dancer, actress, choreographer and singer. She worked predominantly in musical theater, starring in Broadway productions such as Coco (1969), Over Here! (1974), Goodtime Charley (1975), Chicago (1977), Dancin' (1978), and Sweet Charity (1986).

Reinking won the Tony Award for Best Choreography for her work in the 1996 revival of Chicago, which she choreographed while reprising the role of Roxie Hart. For the 2000 West End production of Fosse, she won the Olivier Award for Best Theatre Choreographer. She also appeared in the films All That Jazz (1979), Annie (1982), and Micki & Maude (1984).

Early life
Ann Reinking was born on November 10, 1949, in Seattle, the daughter of Frances (née Harrison), a homemaker, and Walter Floyd Reinking, a hydraulic engineer. She grew up in Bellevue. As a child, Reinking began ballet lessons, studying with former Ballets Russes dancers Marian and Illaria Ladre in Seattle.

Reinking made her professional performing debut at the age of 12 in a production of Giselle  with the English Royal Ballet. While attending middle school and high school, she studied at the San Francisco Ballet during the summers as a part of a scholarship. After graduating from Bellevue High School, she took summer classes offered by Joffrey Ballet at the Pacific Lutheran University in Tacoma, Washington.

Career
Reinking moved to New York City at age 18, and danced as a member of the corps de ballet at the Radio City Music Hall, performed in the ensemble of the second national tour of Fiddler on the Roof, and at the age of 19 made her Broadway debut in the musical Cabaret. She was a chorus dancer in Coco (1969), Wild and Wonderful (1971), and Pippin (1972). During Pippin, she came to the attention of the show's director and choreographer Bob Fosse. Reinking became Fosse's protégée and romantic partner, even as Fosse was still legally married to (though separated from) Gwen Verdon at the time.

In 1974, Reinking came to critical notice in the role of Maggie in Over Here!, winning a Theatre World Award. She starred as Joan of Arc in Goodtime Charley in 1975, receiving Tony Award and Drama Desk nominations for Best Actress in a Musical. In 1976, she replaced Donna McKechnie as Cassie in A Chorus Line; in 1977, she replaced Verdon in the starring role of Roxie Hart in Chicago, a show directed and choreographed by Fosse. In 1978, she appeared in Fosse's revue Dancin', and received another Tony nomination. In that year, Reinking and Fosse ended their romance and separated. However, they continued to have a professional, creative collaboration. Fosse's influence on Reinking's work as a choreographer could be seen in her retention of his "dark, jazzlike, fluid body movements." In 1979, Reinking appeared in Fosse's semi-autobiographical film All That Jazz as Katie Jagger, a role loosely based on her own life and relationship with Fosse. Reinking appeared in two more feature films, as Grace Farrell in Annie (1982) and as Micki Salinger in Micki & Maude (1984). In a 2019 mini-series aired on FX, Fosse/Verdon, Margaret Qualley portrayed Reinking and her relationship with Fosse.

In March 1985, Reinking appeared at the 57th Academy Awards to give a mostly lip-synced vocal performance accompanied by a dance routine of the Academy Award-nominated Phil Collins single "Against All Odds (Take a Look at Me Now)". The routine was poorly received by critics from the Los Angeles Times and People, as well as by Collins himself in a Rolling Stone interview. In 1986, she returned to Broadway, replacing Debbie Allen in a successful revival of Fosse's production of Sweet Charity. In 1991, she appeared in her first theater production following the birth of her son, the Broadway National Tour of Bye Bye Birdie, costarring Tommy Tune. In 1992, she contributed choreography to Tommy Tune Tonite!, a three-man revue featuring Tune. Reinking founded the Broadway Theater Project, a Florida training program connecting students with seasoned theater professionals, in 1994. In 1995, she choreographed the ABC television movie version of Bye Bye Birdie.

Reinking had retired from performing by this time. In 1996, she was asked to create the choreography "in the style of Bob Fosse" for an all-star four-night-only concert staging of Chicago for City Center's annual Encores! Concert Series. When the producers could not obtain a suitable actress for the role of Roxie Hart, Reinking agreed to reprise the role after almost 20 years. This concert staging of Chicago was a hit, and a few months later the production (in its concert staging presentation) was produced on Broadway, with the Encores! cast: Reinking, Bebe Neuwirth, Joel Grey, James Naughton, and Marcia Lewis. In November 2016, the revival celebrated its 20th year, and as of March 2020, when theaters temporarily closed due to the COVID-19 pandemic, it was the longest-running American musical on Broadway. The revival of Chicago won numerous Tony Awards, and Reinking won the Tony Award for Best Choreography. She recreated her choreography for the 1997 London transfer of Chicago, which starred Ute Lemper and Ruthie Henshall.

In 1998, she co-created, co-directed and co-choreographed the revue Fosse, receiving a Tony Award co-nomination for Best Direction of a Musical. For her work on the West End production of Fosse, Reinking (along with the late Bob Fosse himself) won the 2001 Olivier Award for Best Theatre Choreographer.

In 2001, she received an honorary doctorate from Florida State University for her contribution to the arts. Reinking served as a judge of annual New York City public school dance competitions for inner-city youth, and appeared in Mad Hot Ballroom, the 2005 documentary film about the competition. Reinking collaborated with composer Bruce Wolosoff and Thodos Dance Chicago to create the ballet The Devil in the White City, based on the novel of the same name by Erik Larsen; the Chicago Sun-Times named it "Best Dance of 2011." Reinking again collaborated with Wolosoff in 2013 to create A Light in the Dark, a ballet inspired by the lives of Helen Keller and Ann Sullivan, which was nominated for a Chicago/Midwest Emmy Award in Outstanding Achievement for Arts/Entertainment Programming. In 2012, she contributed choreography for the Broadway production of An Evening with Patti LuPone and Mandy Patinkin. She served as a member of the advising committee for the American Theatre Wing.

Personal life
Reinking married four times. She was first married on March 19, 1972, to Broadway actor Larry Small, whom she divorced the same year. Reinking was married to investment banker Herbert Allen Jr. from 1982 to 1989. In 1989, she married businessman James Stuart, with whom she had a son, Christopher, before their divorce in 1991. Reinking married sportswriter Peter Talbert in 1994, and was stepmother to his four children.

Reinking retired in 2017 and lived in Paradise Valley, Arizona.

Reinking's son has Marfan syndrome, and Reinking worked with the Marfan Foundation, which is dedicated to raising awareness of the disease. She produced the 2009 documentary In My Hands: A Story of Marfan Syndrome.

Death
Reinking died in her sleep at a hotel in Seattle on December 12, 2020, at the age of 71, while on a visit to her family in the area.

Upon her death, the lobby of the Ambassador Theatre, home of the current revival of Chicago, installed an "In Memoriam" poster of her in costume as Roxie Hart from the 1996 opening cast.

Credits

Awards

References

External links

 
 
 

Audio/video

1949 births
2020 deaths
20th-century American actresses
Actresses from Seattle
American choreographers
American female dancers
American film actresses
American musical theatre actresses
Ballet choreographers
Dancers from Washington (state)
Drama Desk Award winners
Helpmann Award winners
Laurence Olivier Award winners
People from Bellevue, Washington
People from Paradise Valley, Arizona
Tony Award winners